Tâdj ol-Molouk (17 March 1896 – 10 March 1982) was  Queen of Iran as the wife of Reza Shah, founder of the Pahlavi dynasty and Shah of Iran between 1925 and 1941. The title she was given after becoming queen means "Crown of the Kings" in the Persian language. She was the first queen in Iran after the Muslim conquest in the seventh century to have participated in public royal representation, and she played a major role in the kashf-e hijab (ban of the veil) in 1936.

Biography
She was the daughter of Brigadier General Teymūr Khan Ayromlou, of the Turkic Ayrum tribe, and wife Malek os-Soltan.

Her marriage with Reza Khan took place in 1916. It was arranged and proved an advantage in the military career of Reza Khan at the time, due to the connections of her father, enabling him to advance in the Cossack hierarchy. Together, they had four children: Shams, Mohammad Reza, the last Shah of Iran, and his twin sister Ashraf, and Ali Reza.

On 23 February 1921, Reza Khan took power in a coup in Tehran.

Queen

On 15 December 1925, her spouse declared himself Shahanshah (King of Kings), and she was granted the title Maleke (Queen).

Privately, Tadj ol-Molouk did not live with Reza Shah at this point, as he reportedly devoted his time on his other wives, Turan Amirsoleimani, and, from 1923, Esmat Dowlatshahi. Neither did she involve herself in politics on her own initiative.  However, it was she who was given the position of Queen during his reign, which signified an important role in his policy on women. She was the first Queen of Iran to have played a public role, and to have performed an official position out in public society.

Her role as a queen participating in public representational duties had a great importance within the new policy of women's role in Iran, as it was the policy of her husband to increase women's participation in society as a method of modernization, in accordance with the example of Turkey.  

In 1928, the queen attended the Fatima Masumeh Shrine during her pilgrimage in Qom wearing a veil which did not cover her completely as well as showing her face, for which she was harshly criticised by a cleric. As a response, Reza Shah publicly beat the cleric who had criticised the queen the next day.  The reform to allow female teachers and students not to veil, as well as allowing female students to study alongside men, were all reforms oposed and criticised by the Shia clergy. 

She played an important part in the abolition of the veil in Iran during the reign of her husband: the Kashf-e hijab. The unveiling of women had a huge symbolic importance to achieve women's participation in society, and the shah introduced the reform gradually so as not to cause unrest: while women teachers were encouraged to unveil in 1933 and schoolgirls and women students in 1935, the official declaration of unveiling were made on 8 January 1936, and the queen and her daughters were given an important role in this event. That day, Reza Shah attended the graduation ceremony of the Tehran Teacher's College with the queen and their two daughters unveiled and dressed in modern clothes, without veils. The queen handed out diplomas, while the shah spoke about half the population being disregarded, and told women that the future was now in their hands. This was the first time an Iranian queen showed herself in public. Afterwards, the Shah had pictures of his wife and daughters published, and unveiling enforced throughout Iran.

Tadj ol-Molouk continued to participate in public representation in this fashion when obliged to by her husband and thus played an indirect role in his policy, but she never made any initiatives of her own and stayed out of political involvement. In 1939, she attended the wedding of her son to Fawzia of Egypt. The relationship to Fawzia was not, however, described as a good one.

Later life
On 16 September 1941, Reza Shah was deposed and exiled.  She did not follow him to his exile in South Africa, instead choosing to remain at the court of her son in Iran. A year after Reza Shah's death, she married Gholamhossein Saheb Divani, the son of a prominent family from Shiraz who was her junior. He was later elected to the National Consultative Assembly.

She held significant influence over her son and reportedly dominated the royal household. The conflict between Tadj ol-Molouk and her daughter-in-law Queen Fawzia attracted attention at the time, and reportedly participated in the factors which lead to the departure of Fawzia to Egypt and the dissolution of the royal marriage in 1948. She was acknowledged to have had a deeply devoted relationship to Princess Shahnaz.

In 1950, Tadj ol-Molouk participated in arranging the marriage between her son the shah and Soraya Esfandiari-Bakhtiari. She left Iran with most of the members of the royal house during the premiership of Mossadegh when the latter asked the Shah to expel them from Iran. They returned to Iran after the fall of Mossadegh in 1953.

During the reign of her son, Tadj ol-Molouk normally did not participate in royal representation, in contrast to her daughters and daughter-in-law, nor did she participate much in charity. She did not fully attend the coronation of the shah on 26 October 1967, attending only the reception following it rather than the coronation itself. She did arrange two receptions in her palace annually: one to celebrate the birthday of her eldest grandson, and one to celebrate the fall of Mossadegh. When the health of the shah was beginning to deteriorate in 1971, this was not admitted, and the official reason for physicians to visit the palace was for the sake of the elderly Tadj ol-Molouk.

Before the 1979 revolution, Tadj ol-Molouk was sent by Mohammad Reza Pahlavi to the house of Shams Pahlavi in Beverly Hills. She arrived in Los Angeles on 30 December 1978 aboard an Imperial Iranian Air Force Boeing 747. Soon after her arrival, on 2 January 1979, Iranian students in the city attacked the house and attempted to burn it. Then she and her daughter took refuge at the Palm Springs estate of Walter Annenberg, former US ambassador to the United Kingdom.

She died in Acapulco, Mexico, on 10 March 1982, seven days before her 86th birthday.

Honours

National 
 House of Pahlavi: Knight Grand Cordon of the Order of the Light of the Aryans
 House of Pahlavi: Dame Grand Cordon of the Order of the Pleiades, 1st Class
 House of Pahlavi: Former Grand Mistress Dame Grand Cordon of the Order of Aftab
 House of Pahlavi: Former Grand Mistress Dame Grand Cordon of the Order of the Pleiades, 1st Class
 House of Pahlavi: Recipient of the Emperor Reza Shah I Coronation Medal
 House of Pahlavi: Recipient of the Commemorative Medal of the 2,500 year Celebration of the Persian Empire
 House of Pahlavi: Recipient of the Emperor Reza Shah I Centennial Medal

Foreign 
 Kingdom of Egypt, Egyptian Royal Family: Dame Grand Cross of the Order of the Virtues, Supreme Class

References

Other sources
 Yves Bomati et Houchang Nahavandi: Mohammad Réza Pahlavi, le dernier shah - 1919–1980 . Editions Perrin, Paris, 2013.

External links

People of Pahlavi Iran
1896 births
1982 deaths
Iranian former Shia Muslims
Wives of Reza Shah
People from Baku
Emigrants from the Russian Empire to Iran
Iranian Azerbaijanis
Exiles of the Iranian Revolution in the United States
Iranian emigrants to the United States
Exiles of the Iranian Revolution in Mexico
Spouses of prime ministers of Iran
Iranian queens
Turkic female royalty
Queen mothers